William Davidson Anderson (died 26 April 1915) was an Irish athlete. He competed for Great Britain in two events at the 1906 Intercalated Games. Anderson was killed during World War I.

Personal life
Anderson served as a private in the 5th Battalion, Canadian Expeditionary Force during the First World War. He died of wounds following the Second Battle of Ypres on 26 April 1915. He is buried at Boulogne Eastern Cemetery.

See also
 List of Olympians killed in World War I

References

Year of birth missing
1915 deaths
Irish male middle-distance runners
Olympic athletes of Great Britain
Athletes (track and field) at the 1906 Intercalated Games
Canadian Expeditionary Force soldiers
Canadian military personnel killed in World War I
Irish emigrants to Canada (before 1923)
Canadian Army soldiers